Arran Brown (born 24 March 1985 in Johannesburg) is a South African professional road cyclist, riding for Team Cycle Fit - RoadCover. Brown started cycling at the age of 16 and joined his first professional team at the age of 20. In 2007 he won his first major race, the South African National U/23 Time Trial Championships. In the same year he also placed third in the South African National U/23 Road Race Championships. 2009 was another major year for Brown as he became South Africa's first "Triple Crown" winner, winning the Cape Argus Cycle Tour, the MTN Amashovashova Classic and the Momentum 94.7 Cycle Challenge.

Brown is the owner of South African cycling set-up company, AB Cycle Fit and is assisted by fellow professional cyclist Richard Baxter. On 18 November 2012, Brown and Baxter announced the formation of the Cycle Fit team. The team will only be racing locally in South Africa in 2013, with the intention of winning the local races.

Achievements 

2007
 1st SA National U/23 Time Trial Championships
 3rd SA National U/23 Road Race Championships
2008
 2nd Amashovashova National Classic
2009
 1st Cape Argus Cycle Tour
 1st 94.7 Cycle Challenge
 1st MTN Amashovashova Classic
 1st Alpha Pharm Seeding Series
2010
 1st Tour of Delhi
 1st MTN Amashovashova Classic
 1st MTN OFM Classic
 2nd 94.7 Cycle Challenge
2011
 1st 94.7 Cycle Challenge
Tour du Maroc
1st Points classification
1st Stages 3 & 9
 1st Pick 'n Pay Knysna Oyster Festival Cycle Classic
 1st Engen Dynamic Cycle Challenge
 1st Stage 5 Tour of Free State
 1st Race 4 Victory
 2nd Tour Durban Road Race
 2nd Carousel Classic
 2nd Randfontein EPR
2012
Tour du Maroc
1st Stages 3, 4, 9 & 10
 1st Dischem Ride for Sight
 1st Carnival City Macsteel National Classic
 1st MTN OFM Classic
 2nd VW EP Herald
 3rd The Fast One
 3rd 94.7 Cycle Challenge

References

External links

AB Cycle Fit
MTN Qhubeka

1985 births
Living people
South African male cyclists
Cyclists from Johannesburg
White South African people